Tyron Zeuge (born 12 May 1992) is a German professional boxer who held the WBA (Regular) super-middleweight title from 2016 to 2018.

Professional career

Zeuge vs. Beroshvili 
On January 25, 2014, Zeuge defeated George Beroshvili by tenth-round unanimous decision to win the WBO Youth super middleweight title.

Zeuge vs. Sabau 
On April 5, 2014, Zeuge defeated Gheorghe Sabau by ninth-round technical knockout to retain the WBO Youth super middleweight title.

Zeuge vs. Barakat 
On August 16, 2014, Zeuge defeated Baker Barakat by ninth-round technical knockout to win the IBF International super middleweight title.

Zeuge vs. Ekpo 
On March 24, 2018, Zeuge fought Isaac Ekpo. Zeuge won the fight via second-round TKO and successfully defended his WBA Regular super middleweight title for the third time in a row.

Zeuge vs. Fielding 
On July 14, 2018, Zeuge was slated to defend his WBA belt against Rocky Fielding, who was ranked #4 by the WBA at super middleweight. Fielding dominated the fight and won via fifth-round TKO to win the WBA belt from Zeuge.

Professional boxing record

References

External links

Tyron Zeuge - Profile, News Archive & Current Rankings at Box.Live

1992 births
Living people
German male boxers
World Boxing Association champions
Boxers from Berlin
World super-middleweight boxing champions
Super-middleweight boxers